Robert Singleton may refer to:
Robert Singleton (priest) (died 1544), English Roman Catholic priest
Robert Singleton (activist) (born 1936), Freedom Rider during 1961
Robert Corbet Singleton (1810–1881), Irish academic and hymnwriter
Robert S. Singleton (born 1933), American engineer and inventor

See also
Robert Singleton-Salmon (1897–1970), British tea planter, businessman and a member of parliament